Briefings in Functional Genomics is a bimonthly peer-reviewed scientific journal covering genomics. It was established in 2002 as Briefings in Functional Genomics & Proteomics, obtaining its current title in 2010. It is published by Oxford University Press and the editor-in-chief is Paul Hurd (Queen Mary University of London). According to the Journal Citation Reports, the journal has a 2020 impact factor of 4.241.

References

External links

Genetics in the United Kingdom
Genomics journals
Oxford University Press academic journals
English-language journals
Publications established in 2002